The 2015 India Super Series was the second super series tournament of the 2015 BWF Super Series. The tournament took place in Siri Fort Sports Complex, New Delhi, India from 24–29 March 2015 and had a total purse of $275,000. A qualification was held to fill four places in both singles events and Men's doubles of the main draws. Results and scores are provided in detail in the page.

Men's singles

Seeds

Top half

Bottom half

Finals

Women's singles

Seeds

Top half

Bottom half

Finals

Men's doubles

Seeds

Top half

Bottom half

Finals

Women's doubles

Seeds

Top half

Bottom half

Finals

Mixed doubles

Seeds

Top half

Bottom half

Finals

References 

2015 BWF Super Series
India Open (badminton)
2015 in Indian sport
Sport in New Delhi